OGLE-TR-113b is an extrasolar planet orbiting the star OGLE-TR-113.

In 2002 the Optical Gravitational Lensing Experiment (OGLE) detected periodic dimming in the star's light curve indicating a transiting, planetary-sized object. Since low-mass red dwarfs and brown dwarfs may mimic a planet, radial velocity measurements were necessary to calculate the mass of the body. In 2004, the object was proved to be a new transiting extrasolar planet.

The planet has a mass 1.32 times that of Jupiter. Since the planet's inclination is known, the value is exact. It orbits the star (OGLE-TR-113) in an extremely close orbit, even closer than the famous planets 51 Pegasi b and HD 209458 b. The planet races around the star every 1.43 days. The radius of the planet is only 9% larger than Jupiter's, despite the heating effect by the star. Planets of its kind are sometimes called "super-hot Jupiters".

See also 
 OGLE-TR-132b
List of extrasolar planets
 OGLE-TR-10b
 OGLE-TR-111b
 OGLE-TR-56b
 OGLE2-TR-L9b

References

External links 

 

Hot Jupiters
Transiting exoplanets
Exoplanets discovered in 2002
Giant planets
Carina (constellation)